Miho Tanaka may refer to:

 Miho Tanaka (badminton) (born 1976), Japanese badminton player
 Miho Tanaka (model) (born 1983), Japanese model